Lucy Awuni Mbun is a Ghanaian politician and a former deputy Upper East Regional Minister of Ghana. He was appointed by President John Evan Atta Mills and served till January 2013.

References

Living people
National Democratic Congress (Ghana) politicians
Year of birth missing (living people)